Komhyr Ridge is a prominent ridge immediately east of Hochstein Ridge in the northwestern part of the Queen Elizabeth Range, Antarctica. It was mapped by the United States Geological Survey from tellurometer surveys and Navy air photos, 1960–62. The Advisory Committee on Antarctic Names named the formation after Walter D. Komhyr, a  United States Antarctic Research Program meteorologist at McMurdo Station, 1963–1964.

References

Ridges of the Ross Dependency
Shackleton Coast